The 2008 Major League Lacrosse season was the eighth season of the league. The season began on May 17, 2008, and concluded with the championship game on August 24, 2008.

Milestones and events

Pre-season 
 Following the 2007 MLL season, the league saw a number of head coaching changes:
 Chicago Machine Assistant Coach John Combs was promoted to the team's new head coach, following the resignation of former head coach, Lelan Rodgers. Rodgers, stepped down from the position to accept an assistant coaching position at Syracuse University.
 Washington Bayhawks hired former Bayhawks player, and head coach of the Denver Outlaws, Jared Testa to lead the team. Scott Hiller, two-time winner of the Major League Lacrosse Coach of the Year Award remains with the team as general manager.
 San Francisco Dragons hired Tom Slate to be the team's head coach. Slate had been an assistant coach with the Philadelphia Barrage.
 There were also a number of trades and player announcements in the off-season:
 January 23, 2008: The Los Angeles Riptide traded team captain Matt Ogelsby and midfielder Garrett Wilson to the San Francisco Dragons for United States Naval Academy graduate Ben Bailey.
 March 3, 2008: The Chicago Machine traded midfielder Zach Heffner and hard-hitting defenseman Steve Panarelli to the San Francisco Dragons, for Mitch Hendler and Greg Rommel.
 March 4, 2008:Washington Bayhawks midfielder, and former Ivy League Player of the Year and 2006 McLaughlin Award co-winner, Joe Boulukos announced his retirement
 March 11, 2008:The Boston Cannons traded David Mitchell and a draft pick to the San Francisco Dragons, for defenseman Colin Hulme and attackman Matt Alrich.
 March 13, 2008: The San Francisco Dragons traded former Major League Lacrosse Offensive Player of the Year Award and MVP Ryan Powell, and midfielder Nate Watkins, to the Denver Outlaws in exchange for a first round and second round pick in the 2008 MLL Collegiate Draft.
 May 2, 2008: The New Jersey Pride traded Princeton University all-time leading goal scorer Jesse Hubbard to the Los Angeles Riptide in exchange for a first round 2009 MLL Collegiate Draft pick.

Regular season 
 The San Francisco Dragons moved their home games to Spartan Stadium in San Jose, California from Kezar Stadium in San Francisco.
 The Washington Bayhawks moved their home games to George Mason Stadium in Fairfax, Virginia from Georgetown University's Multi-Sport Field in Washington.
 The Philadelphia Barrage played the 2008 season as a traveling team. Their "home games" were played in Virginia Beach, Virginia; Irving, Texas; Saint Louis, Missouri; Cary, North Carolina; Boston, Massachusetts and Hillsboro, Oregon.
 May 28: Major League Lacrosse held its annual Collegiate Draft. Paul Rabil was selected with the first overall pick by the Boston Cannons.
 June 10: Casey Powell became the all-time leading scorer in Major League Lacrosse eclipsing Mark Millon's mark.
 June 23: The Washington Bayhawks traded midfielder Bill McGlone and a draft pick, to the San Francisco Dragons in exchange for Jarrett Park and Hunter Lochte.
 July 27: Jesse Hubbard became the all-time leading goal leader in Major League Lacrosse eclipsing Mark Millon's mark.
 August 4: Kevin Huntley of the Los Angeles Riptide set a record for goals scored by a rookie breaking Adam Doneger's mark set in 2003.

Post-season 
 August 24: The Rochester Rattlers win their first MLL championship with a 16–6 win over the Denver Outlaws in Boston.

Standings 
W = Wins, L = Losses, PCT = Winning Percentage, GF = Goals For, 2ptGF = 2 point Goals For, GA = Goals Against, 2ptGA = 2 point Goals Against

Final

Los Angeles finished ahead of Philadelphia based on head-to-head record of 1–0. Philadelphia finished ahead of Boston based on head-to-head record of 2–0.

All Star Game 
The 2008 MLL All-Star Game was played on July 17 at INVESCO Field at Mile High in Denver, Colorado. The Western Conference team won 31-15. Ryan Powell of Denver was named the game Most Valuable Player.

Playoffs 
The 2008 NB Zip Major League Lacrosse Championship Weekend took place on August 23 and 24 at Harvard Stadium in Boston, Massachusetts. The semifinals took place on August 23 and the final was on August 24.

Joe Walters was named MVP for the playoffs

Awards

Weekly awards 
The MLL gives out awards weekly for the best offensive player, best defensive player, best goalkeeper, and best rookie.

Annual awards

References

External links 
 MLL Moments to Remember, 2008

8
Major League Lacrosse